The Saint Barts blind snake (Antillotyphlops annae) is a species of blind snake in the family Typhlopidae. The species is endemic to the Caribbean island of Saint Barthélemy, an overseas collectivity of France. The species was first described in 1999, and it is still not well known.

Etymology
The specific name, annae, is in honor of Anne Breuil, who is the wife of the describer.

Habitat
The preferred natural habitat of A. annae is forest.

Reproduction
A. annae is oviparous.

See also
List of amphibians and reptiles of Saint Barthélemy

References

External links

Further reading
Breuil M (1999). "Nouvelle espèce du genre Typhlops, (Serpentes, Typhlopidae) de l'île de Saint-Barthélemy , comparison avec les autres espèces des Petites Antilles [= New species of the genus Typhlops, (Serpentes, Typhlopidae) from the island of Saint-Barthélemy, comparison with the other species of the Lesser Antilles]". Bulletin mensuel de la Societé linnéenne de Lyon 68 (2): 30–40. (Typhlops annae, new species). (in French with an abstract in English).
Hedges, Stephen B.; Marion, Angela B.; Lipp, Kelly M.; Marin, Julie; Vidal, Nicolas (2014). "A taxonomic framework for typhlopid snakes from the Caribbean and other regions (Reptilia, Squamata)". Caribbean Herpetology (49): 1-61. (Antillotyphlops annae, new combination).

annae
Reptiles of Saint Barthélemy
Reptiles described in 1999